Carl Pfeiffer may refer to:

 Carl Pfeiffer (pharmacologist) (1908–1988), one of the founders of orthomolecular psychiatry
 Carl Pfeiffer (architect) (1834–1888), German-born NYC architect
 Carl Pfeiffer (malacologist), see Lithoglyphus naticoides

See also
Karl Pfeiffer (disambiguation)